Methven is a small town in the Canterbury region of the South Island of New Zealand.  It is located near the western edge of the Canterbury Plains, 35 kilometres north of Ashburton and 95 kilometres west of Christchurch, and at an elevation of 320m. The town is a service centre for agriculture in the surrounding area, and is a base for skiing at the nearby Mount Hutt skifield. The town slogan is "Amazing Space".

History 
In 1869, Robert Patton purchased a  farm property and called it Methven, after the name of his old home town in Perthshire, Scotland.  The name of the farm subsequently became the name of the town and surrounding district.  Sections in the township were offered for sale by public auction on 24 June 1878 at South Rakaia, and sold for between 20 and 95 pounds.

In 1879, Robert Patton applied to the Ashburton Licensing Court for a license to operate a new house at Methven to be called the Methven Hotel. A hotel was built in 1880.  In 1882, Patton applied to the Licensing District of Mount Hutt for a publican's license for the 24 room Methven hotel. The Methven Branch railway line from Rakaia to Methven was completed in 1880.  The terminus of the railway line was at the junction of six roads, in the centre of the town as it stands today.  By 1882–83, further sections of land were sold around the area that would subsequently become the town of Methven. By the time that Robert Patton died on 20 October 1889, Methven had a butcher, baker, grocer, draper and a blacksmiths, in addition to the hotel. 

The Methven School was opened on 7 February 1882, with an opening school roll of 41.  The Chairman of the School Committee was Robert Patton. The school remained as a Primary school, until secondary schooling was established in Methven in 1925.

A notable early farmer in the Methven district was Duncan Cameron. He was initially the manager of a large  property called Springfield, employing 100 men through the year, and 200 during harvesting. Cameron became the owner of the Springfield property in 1890. He had  in crops most years, and in one year had 5,500 acres in wheat. He was an early pioneer of irrigation in the district. His use of irrigation enabled cropping and increased stock-carrying, and led the way for later investments in irrigation in the district. Cameron was also a pioneer for the frozen meat export industry. 

The Mount Hutt Road Board office was completed in 1879.  Despite the depression of the 1880s and 1890s, the Methven library was built in 1883. The Anglican church was built in 1880 and the Catholic church in 1888. The population of Methven town was 300 people in 1902. Methven contributed troops to the First World War with 69 of them losing their lives. In the 1920s Methven slowly changed from having livery stables and smithies to garages and engineering firms to service cars and farm machinery. The 1920s also saw the arrival in Methven of companies such as Dalgety's and Wright Stevenson and Co. Trucking firms also aimed to compete with the railways to ship farm goods such as wool to the ports. Electricity also arrived around this time. The farm labourers who working on the local farms often resided in Methven or came to Methven to socialize after work. Farm labourers frequented the grocery stores, clothing retailer, pubs, billiard halls, brothels, and boarding houses that were present in Methven in the early days of the town. The Methven branch railway line closed in 1976.

For the first 100 years of Methven's existence, its primary role was that of servicing the needs of farmers and farm labour.

Methven expanded dramatically in 2021 with over three hundred residential sections sold. This is expected to lead to an increase in the population to 2411 people by 2023. The population was expected to climb to this number in the year 2048 according to Ashburton District Council projections.

Governance 
Methven is part of the Rangitata electorate. The Ashburton District Council is responsible for providing local government services to Methven.

Demographics 

Methven had a population of 1,779 at the 2018 New Zealand census, an increase of 60 people (3.5%) since the 2013 census, and an increase of 375 people (26.7%) since the 2006 census. There were 723 households. There were 906 males and 873 females, giving a sex ratio of 1.04 males per female. Almost 50% of Methven residents are married and a further 33.7% have never married nor been in a civil union.
The median age was 39.9 years (compared with 37.4 years nationally), with 351 people (19.7%) aged under 15 years, 318 (17.9%) aged 15 to 29, 843 (47.4%) aged 30 to 64, and 267 (15.0%) aged 65 or older.

Ethnicities were 91.6% European/Pākehā, 8.4% Māori, 1.2% Pacific peoples, 3.5% Asian, and 2.2% other ethnicities (totals add to more than 100% since people could identify with multiple ethnicities).

The proportion of people born overseas was 21.4%, compared with 27.1% nationally.

Although some people objected to giving their religion, 54.3% had no religion, 36.9% were Christian, 0.3% were Hindu, 0.2% were Buddhist and 1.9% had other religions.

Of those at least 15 years old, 294 (20.6%) people had a bachelor or higher degree, and 240 (16.8%) people had no formal qualifications. The median income was $39,200, compared with $31,800 nationally. The employment status of those at least 15 was that 822 (57.6%) people were employed full-time, 240 (16.8%) were part-time, and 36 (2.5%) were unemployed.

Cairnbrae

Cairnbrae had a population of 1,449 at the 2018 New Zealand census, an increase of 45 people (3.2%) since the 2013 census, and an increase of 213 people (17.2%) since the 2006 census. There were 546 households. There were 780 males and 663 females, giving a sex ratio of 1.18 males per female. The median age was 35.2 years (compared with 37.4 years nationally), with 360 people (24.8%) aged under 15 years, 258 (17.8%) aged 15 to 29, 714 (49.3%) aged 30 to 64, and 117 (8.1%) aged 65 or older.

Ethnicities were 83.9% European/Pākehā, 5.2% Māori, 1.2% Pacific peoples, 13.7% Asian, and 1.2% other ethnicities (totals add to more than 100% since people could identify with multiple ethnicities).

The proportion of people born overseas was 25.1%, compared with 27.1% nationally.

Although some people objected to giving their religion, 42.7% had no religion, 50.7% were Christian, 0.4% were Hindu, 0.2% were Muslim, 0.2% were Buddhist and 0.8% had other religions.

Of those at least 15 years old, 204 (18.7%) people had a bachelor or higher degree, and 147 (13.5%) people had no formal qualifications. The median income was $43,300, compared with $31,800 nationally. The employment status of those at least 15 was that 669 (61.4%) people were employed full-time, 219 (20.1%) were part-time, and 18 (1.7%) were unemployed.

Climate 
Snow falls a few days each year in Methven in the winter months of June, July and August.

Rural services centre 

Methven is a rural service town  that supports the local region. Dairy farming, sharecropping, sheep farming and seed production and distribution are major players in the farming industry around Methven. 

The Mount Hutt Memorial Hall (160 Main Street, Methven) contains the New Zealand Alpine & Agriculture Encounter. It aims to provide an understanding of farming in the area.

Methven has an annual A & P Show each year at the A & P Show grounds in Methven. The 2020 A & P show was cancelled due to the Covid-19 Lockdown in New Zealand.

Ski town 
In 1971, the Methven Lions Club studied whether Mount Hutt could be developed into a ski field. The study suggested that this was possible and it led to the opening of a skifield in 1973.  Mount Hutt skifield is around half an hour away from Methven. Although the majority of skiers usually made the journey to Mount Hutt from Christchurch on a daily basis, some would stay the weekend in Methven and need accommodation, dinner and services. This led to the establishment of a number of hotels, motels, restaurants and other tourist activities being developed. The town center was redeveloped with 14 new shops built in 1975. Development continued and by 1989 Methven had five hotels, three motels, twenty ski lodges, two camping grounds and nine restaurants.

During winter, Methven undergoes a significant transformation. A number of cafes, bars, and restaurants lie relatively dormant over the summer months, but become busy during the ski season. Similarly, the town's accommodation providers have a strongly seasonal trade. The New Zealand Ski Heritage Museum was established in 2000. It is located in the Mount Hutt Memorial Hall (160 Main Street, Methven). It includes ski fashions, antique ski equipment and Winter Olympic memorabilia. Methven is also a base for heliskiing in the Arrowsmith range of mountains. The annual Peak to Pub race starts at the top of Mount Hutt where competitors ski two kilometres ski down the mountain to the car park. This is followed by an 18km mountain bike ride down the ski road, followed by a 12km run into Methven.

Methven tourism businesses have struggled in 2020 due to the Covid-19 virus. The Methven Resort Hotel, was placed into liquidation in June 2020. The hotel had a 100-seat restaurant, a large swimming pool and multiple spa pools.

Other sport and recreation 

In addition to skiing, horse riding is popular and there are a number of companies that offer horse treks in and around Methven. Hot air ballooning is also possible to do in Methven. The Methven i-SITE Visitor Centre is located at 160 Main Street, Methven. The Methven skatepark was opened in 2020. It sits in the centre of town in the reserve at Bank and McMillan Streets. Significant local fundraising efforts were required to make the skatepark a reality.

Walking and tramping 
Walking and tramping in the hills and  mountains surrounding Methven is a popular pastime. Local walks include:

Rakaia Gorge Walkway 
The start of the Rakaia Gorge Walkway is an 11-kilometer drive from Methven. The track is 10.4 kilometers there and back which will take the average walker three to four hours to complete the return journey.

Mount Hutt Forest 
Short walks in the Mount Hutt Forest (which is 12.5 kilometers from Methven) include the Rhododendron Walk; Te Awa Awa Walk; Alder Track;  Opuke Track and the Ridge Track. A longer walk is the Pudding Hill Stream (8.25 kilometers, 3 hours one way) and the Scotts Saddle Track (4.5 kilometers, 2 hours one way)

Mt Alford Conservation Area 
The Mt Alford car park is a 12.5-kilometer drive from Methven. The Mt Alford Track itself is a 4.6-kilometer-long track that climbs to the summit of Mt Alford (1,171 m). It takes approximately three hours one way. The tracks are closed each year in September and October during lambing season.

Mt Somers Walk 
Slightly further away, Mt Somers can be done as a day trip or a two or three day trip with nights in backcountry huts along the way.

The Methven Walkway 
The Methven Walkway is eleven kilometers long and a gentle walk on the flat. Most of the walk is along the Rangitata Diversion Race.

Mountain biking 
Bike Methven has developed a range of mountain bike trails around Methven which cover cross-country, enduro, and downhill trails. The Mount Hutt Bike Park is home to 30 kilometres of trails that are within five minutes of Methven.

Amenities and attractions

Methven Rodeo 
The Methven Rodeo is held annually in October each year and attendances can exceed 6000 people. Events include Barrel Racing, Bull Riding, Saddle Bronc, Steer Wrestling and Team Roping.

Ōpuke Thermal Pools 
The New Zealand Government's provincial growth fund provided a $7.5 million government loan to help fund a new hot pools spa complex which was built next to the Methven Trotting Club. It has both family bathing and an adult-exclusive area. The water is heated by solar power.  The hot pools opened in November 2021 and were described "as money well spent amid challenging times".

Notable buildings

Pipe Shed
The Pipe Shed is a storage shed for explosives that used one of the 800 pipes manufactured in 1940 for the Rangitata Diversion Race. It is the only structure in Methven rated as Category I by Heritage New Zealand.

The Brown Pub 
The Brown Pub was originally built in 1883 but was destroyed by fire on 19 June 1922 and subsequently rebuilt. It suffered damage in the 2010 Canterbury earthquake and the 2011 Christchurch earthquake, and was damaged by fire in 2019.

The Blue Pub 
The Blue Pub was damaged by fire in 1918 and also suffered damage in the Canterbury earthquakes of 2010–11.

Methven War Memorial 
The War Memorial was unveiled in February 1930. It commemorates the 69 men lost in the First World War and the 15 men lost in the Second World War.

Methven Historical Society Building 
This was built in 1917 at 7 Bank Street. It was damaged in the Canterbury earthquakes and was a category 2 historic place. It was demolished in 2013.

Methven Public Library 
Built between 1883 and 1884 at 60 Main Street, in an Italianate style. It was damaged in the Canterbury earthquakes and was a category 2 historic place. It was demolished in 2013.

Mount Hutt Road Board Building 

The Road Board Building was built in 1879 on Methven's Main Street and is one of the earliest buildings in the town.  The building was classified as a Category 2 historic place and registered on the New Zealand Heritage List  in October 2019. The building currently serves as the Methven Toy Library.

All Saints Anglican Church 
The Anglican Church (1 Chapman Street) was built in 1880.

Methven Post Office 
The Methven Post Office reopened as an Irish bar and restaurant in 2015. The original bank safe and other historical items still remain in the building.

Irrigation canal

The Rangitata Diversion Race or RDR is a combined irrigation and power generation scheme that diverts water from the Rangitata River to irrigate over 100,000hectares of farmland in mid-Canterbury. The main canal is 67km long, and passes to the west and north of Methven township.  The RDR project was the first major river diversion in New Zealand, and the largest irrigation scheme in the country. Construction began in 1937, paused for World War 2 and was completed in 1945.

In popular culture 
Methven also served as a base to cast and crew for the filming of Edoras (located further inland at Mt Sunday), for The Lord of the Rings.

The cast and crew of the movie Z for Zachariah stayed in Methven in February and March 2014 while shooting scenes at Washpen Falls near Windwhistle. After a party at the Blue Pub in Methven, Hollywood actor Chris Pine was caught drink-driving by police.

During the 2020 Covid-19 lockdown in New Zealand, Lynda from the Topp Twins and her wife Donna played music from the back of their truck on the way to the supermarket to bring some fun into peoples lives in Methven.

Mountain Thunder motorcycle races 
The Mountain Thunder motorcycle street race was an annual event held in Methven on Easter Saturday for eight years until 2017. Motorcyclists raced on a tight one-kilometre road circuit around the town centre. Speeds of up to 200 kilometres per hour were reached. Competitors came from across New Zealand to compete at this event. The 2017 event was marred by a fatality in one of the races, and the organisers announced later that year that the 2017 event would be the last.

Clubs 
A variety of sporting and other clubs and organisations have existed in Methven. These include:

Sports clubs 

 Methven Rugby Football Club (established 1896)
 Methven Lawn Tennis Association (established 1896)
 Methven Outdoor Bowling Club (established 1918)
 Methven Cricket Club (established 1920)
 Methven Ladies Hockey Club (established 1920)
 Methven Golf Club (established 1924)
 Methven Gun Club (established 1927)
 Methven Trotting Club (established 1927)
 Methven Miniature Rifle Club (established 1927)
 Methven Amateur Swimming Club (established 1934)
 Methven Caledonian Society Netball Club (established 1936)
 Methven Croquet Club (established 1939)

Other organisations 
 The Methven Lodge (established 1883)
 The Loyal Methven Lodge (established 1900)
 Methven Agricultural and Pastoral Association (established 1911)
 Methven Collie Club (established 1911)
 Methven Plunket Society (established 1922)
 Methven Volunteer Fire Brigade (established 1928)
 Methven Country Women's Institute (established 1931)
 Methven Young Farmers Club (established 1935)
 Methven Women's Division Federated Farmers (established 1936)
 Methven Choral Society (established 1941)
 Methven Federated Farmers (established 1945)

Education
Methven has three schools.

 Methven Primary School is a state contributing primary (years 1 to 6) school. It has  students as of  There are 25 staff members who work at the school.
 Mount Hutt College is a state Year 7 to 13 secondary school. It has  students as of 
 Our Lady of Snow School is a state-integrated Catholic full primary (years 1 to 8) school. It has  students as of

Notable people

Sir Graeme Harrison (born 1948), business executive born in Methven and has retired to his birth town
John Kennedy (1926–1994), journalist born in Methven
Kathy Lynch (born 1957), competitive cyclist who has retired to Methven
Dame Lynda Topp of the Topp Twins lives in Methven.

Notable police dog 
Methven was home to Rajah, New Zealand's first police dog. A bronze statue of Rajah sits outside the Mt Hutt Function Centre. It was unveiled on 8 February 2015.

References

Sources

External links

 Whites Aviation: Hand-coloured aerial photo of Methven (1940's)

Ashburton District
Populated places in Canterbury, New Zealand